Alexandru Leu (born 4 May 1991) is a Moldovan football player who currently plays for Glentoran in the NIFL Premiership.

On 24 August, it was announced that Leu would be moving to Glentoran subject to international clearance.

References

External links

Alexandru Leu statistics

1991 births
Living people
Moldovan footballers
Moldova international footballers
Association football defenders
Glentoran F.C. players